Parahoplitidae is an extinct family of Cretaceous ammonites with stoutly ribbed, compressed, generally involute shells lacking or with only minor tubercles included in the Deshayestoidea, a superfamily now separated from the Hoplitacaceae.

Subfamilies and genera
The family contains two subfamilies and eight genera.
 Deshayesitinae Stoyanow, 1949
 Deshayesites Kazansky, 1914
 Dufrenoyia Kilian and Reboul, 1915
 Diadochoceras Hyatt, 1900
 Hypacanthoplites Spath, 1923
 Parahoplitinae Spath, 1922
 Kazanskyella Stoyanow, 1949
 Parahoplites Anthula, 1899
 Sinzowiella Stoyanow, 1949
 Parahoplitoides Spath, 1922

References

 Arkell et al., 1957. Mesozoic Ammonoidea. Treatise on Invertebrate Paleontology, Part L Ammonoidea. Geological Soc of America and University of Kansas press.

Ancyloceratina
Ammonitida families